The eastern yellow wagtail (Motacilla tschutschensis) is a small passerine in the wagtail family Motacillidae, which also includes the pipits and longclaws. It was often classified as a subspecies of the Western yellow wagtail.

This species breeds in the East Palearctic and has a foothold in North America in Alaska. Populations migrate to south Asia and Australia.

Vagrant individuals occur around the winter quarters at migration time. For example, on Palau in Micronesia migrant flocks of this species – apparently of the Bering Sea yellow wagtail, and including many adult males – are regularly seen, while further north on the Marianas, only the occasional stray individual – usually females or immatures as it seems – is encountered.

It is a slender 15–16 cm long bird, with the characteristic long, constantly wagging tail of its genus. The breeding adult male is basically olive above and yellow below. In other plumages, the yellow may be diluted by white. The heads of breeding males come in a variety of colours and patterns depending on subspecies.

The call is a characteristic high-pitched jeet.

This insectivorous bird inhabits open country near water, such as wet meadows. It nests in tussocks, laying 4–8 speckled eggs.

The Acanthocephalan parasite Apororhynchus paulonucleatus was discovered in the colon and cloaca of the Eastern yellow wagtail.

Systematics
This species' systematics and phylogeny is extremely confusing. Literally dozens of subspecies have been described at one time or another, and 5 are currently considered valid depending on which author reviews them. In addition, the citrine wagtail (M. citreola) forms a cryptic species complex with this bird; both taxa as conventionally delimited are paraphyletic in respect to each other.  In addition, some taxonomic authorities continue to keep the eastern and western yellow wagtails together as yellow wagtail, (M. flava).

Current subspecies:
M. t. angarensis (Sushkin, 1925) – South Siberian yellow wagtail.
Males like M. flava plexa, but supercilium more pronounced.
Breeding: From S Siberia S through W Transbaikalia to N Mongolia. Winter: SE Asia.
M. t. leucocephala (Przevalski, 1887) – White-headed yellow wagtail.
Male like M. f. flava, but grey of head very pale, almost white. Female like flava females, but head somewhat darker.
Breeding: NW Mongolia and adjacent PRC and Russia. Winter: probably India.
M. t. taivana (Swinhoe, 1863) – Green-crowned yellow wagtail or Kuril yellow wagtail.
Like M. f. flavissima but daker above, ears much darker, almost black. Sexes similar.
Breeding: between ranges of plexa and tschutschensis S via Sakhalin to N Hokkaidō. Winter: Myanmar to Taiwan, S to Wallacea.
M. t. macronyx (Stresemann, 1920) – Southeast Siberian yellow wagtail.
Males like M. f. thunbergi but brighter and more strongly marked overall. Female like in thunbergi but no supercilium.
Breeding: SE Transbaikalia E to coast, S to Manchuria. Winter: NW of South China Sea.
M. t. simillima Hartert, 1905 – Bering Sea yellow wagtail or short-tailed grey-headed wagtail.
Both sexes similar to corresponding M. f. flava, but supercilium usually less pronounced.
Breeding: Kamchatka and Bering Sea islands, possibly to Aleuts. Winter: SE Asia S to N Australia.

Footnotes

References

 VanderWerf, Eric A.; Wiles, Gary J.; Marshall, Ann P. & Knecht, Melia (2006). Observations of migrants and other birds in Palau, April–May 2005, including the first Micronesian record of a Richard's Pipit. Micronesica 39(1): 11–29. PDF fulltext
 Wiles, Gary J.; Worthington, David J.; Beck, Robert E. Jr.; Pratt, H. Douglas; Aguon, Celestino F. & Pyle, Robert L. (2000). Noteworthy Bird Records for Micronesia, with a Summary of Raptor Sightings in the Mariana Islands, 1988–1999. Micronesica 32(2): 257–284. PDF fulltext

Further reading

Books

 Badyaev, A. V., B. Kessel, and D. D. Gibson. (1998). Yellow Wagtail (Motacilla flava). In The Birds of North America, No. 382 (A. Poole and F. Gill, eds.). The Birds of North America, Inc., Philadelphia, PA.

Articles

 Fraker MA & Fraker RN. (1980). Yellow Wagtail Motacilla-Flava East of the Mackenzie Delta Canada. Canadian Field-Naturalist. vol 94, no 4. p. 465-466.
 Hunt J & Standring I. (1995). A yellow wagtail Motacilla flava at Lake Mclarty. Western Australian Naturalist. vol 20, no 2. p. 61-64.
 Johnstone RE. (1982). The Yellow Wagtail Motacilla-Flava in Australia. Western Australian Naturalist. vol 15, no 3. p. 61-66.
 Moffatt JD. (1981). Yellow Wagtail Motacilla-Flava on Heron Island Queensland Australia with Notes on the Status of Southern Individuals. Emu. vol 81, no 1. p. 47-48.

External links

eastern yellow wagtail
Native birds of Alaska
Birds of North Asia
Birds of Manchuria
eastern yellow wagtail
eastern yellow wagtail